Eugen Meier (composer) (born 1934), Swiss composer and conductor
Eugen Meier (footballer) (1930–2002), Swiss footballer